The Brit Award for Song of the Year is an award given by the British Phonographic Industry (BPI), an organisation which represents record companies and artists in the United Kingdom. The accolade is presented at the Brit Awards, an annual celebration of British and international music. The winners and nominees are determined by the Brit Awards voting academy with over one-thousand members, which comprise record labels, publishers, managers, agents, media, and previous winners and nominees. The award was first known as Brit Award for British Single, from the inaugural 1977 Brit Awards through to the 2019 Brit Awards, was first renamed as Song of the Year in 2020, returned to the name British Single in 2021, then returned to Song of the Year in 2022.

In 1984 and 1991, the category was non-competitive, with the award given directly to the highest-selling single of the year.

The inaugural recipients in this category were Queen and Procol Harum, who both won in 1977. The current holder of the award is Harry Styles, who won in 2023 for "As It Was".

Achievements 

Robbie Williams holds the record for most wins in this category at six, including three as a member of Take That, who have five wins. They are followed by Adele, who has three victories and Queen and Harry Styles, who each have two wins. Williams leads all performers with twelve nominations, followed by Calvin Harris who has eight. Take That have the most nominations as a group with seven. Jess Glynne, Adele and Dua Lipa have the most nods amongst female artists with five each. Ed Sheeran holds the record for most nominations without a win, with seven.

Take That were the first act to win British Single in two consecutive years: for the 1993 ("Could It Be Magic") and 1994 ("Pray"); and they achieved this feat twice, winning in 2007 with "Patience" and 2008 with "Shine". That record was overtaken by Robbie Williams, a former member of the band, when he had three wins in a row with "Angels" (1999), "She's the One" (2000), and "Rock DJ" (2001).

The first female act to win the award was Spice Girls in 1997, for "Wannabe". Dido became the first female solo performer to win in 2004, for "White Flag". Adele is the first female artist to win the award twice, winning for "Skyfall" in 2013 and "Hello" in 2016 and then became the first woman to win three times with 2022's "Easy on Me".

The first and only tie in this category in Brits history happened at the inaugural ceremony in 1977, when both "Bohemian Rhapsody" by Queen and "A Whiter Shade of Pale" by Procol Harum won the award.

Unlike other categories, international artists are eligible for Single/Song of the Year if the primary artist is British. The only foreign artist to ever win this award is Bruno Mars in 2015 as a featured artist on Mark Ronson's "Uptown Funk".

Recipients

1970s

1980s

1990s

2000s

2010s

2020s

Artists with multiple wins

Artists with multiple nominations
12 nominations
 Robbie Williams

8 nominations
 Calvin Harris

7 nominations

5 nominations

4 nominations

3 nominations

2 nominations

Notes

Notes
 "Do They Know It's Christmas?" (1990, 2005) Double Nominated
 "Pray" (1994), "Parklife" (1995), "Never Ever" (1998), "She's the One" (2000), "Rock DJ" (2001) also won Brit Award for British Video of the Year
 "Angels" (2005) also won Brit Award for British Song of Twenty Five Year
 "Wannabe" (2010) also won Brit Award for Live Performance of Thirty Year

References

Brit Awards
 
Song awards
Awards established in 1977
Awards established in 1982
Awards disestablished in 1977